Clementi is a planning area and residential town located at the easternmost fringe of the West Region of Singapore. The town borders Bukit Batok to the north, Bukit Timah to the northeast, Queenstown to the east and Jurong East to the west.

Etymology

"Clementi" derives its name from 'Clementi Road', the main traffic route that still runs into the district to this day. It was once known as 'Reformatory Road' as there was a boys' home situated along the road. In 1947, the Singapore Rural Board discussed renaming the road. Their original intention was to name it after Sir Hugh Clifford, but it was eventually named as Clementi Road. It is generally suggested that the road was named after Sir Cecil Clementi Smith, who was the first British High Commissioner in the Straits Settlements. However, it is also possible that the road was named after Sir Cecil Clementi, another former Governor of the Straits Settlements (1930–33) who initiated the construction of the Kallang Airport.

History
The present area occupying Clementi Avenue 1 used to be known as 'Sussex Estate', named after the historic county of Sussex in England. The road running inside Sussex Estate was called Goodwood Road. It was developed in the mid-1950s to house the families of British senior non-commissioned officers. When Clementi underwent a major transformation beginning in 1975, Sussex Estate was the only pre-development feature that was retained. It was demolished in 1997.
 
Most of the area currently occupied by Clementi New Town today was once a military installation called 'Colombo Camp'. It is not known when the camp came into existence, however what is known is that the Singapore Guard Regiment, formed in 1948, stationed its troops there. When the regiment disbanded in November 1971, the camp was left to stand for another four more years before it was demolished in 1975.
 
Clementi New Town was subsequently developed between 1975 and 1979 on the plot of land that was once occupied by the camp. Planned as a self-sufficient residential town with a range of facilities and services, the Housing and Development Board (HDB) began clearing the area in 1974 and affected villagers were resettled.

An iconic landmark at Clementi is the steel truss railway bridge crossing Sungei Ulu Pandan. It was once part of the Jurong KTMB Railway Line which was constructed to facilitate the transportation of manufactured products from Jurong to Malaysia, and raw materials from Malaysia to the industrial estate at Jurong. Construction of the railway began in 1963, and the first train ran in 1966. The Jurong section of the railway remained in use for the next four decades until its closure in the early 1990s. Today, the disused track continues to attract much interest from the public, especially people with a taste for history, nature and photography.

Geography
Clementi's arterial road, Clementi Road, runs for some 5 kilometres, from the vicinity around Bukit Timah, at Jalan Anak Bukit, to the West Coast Highway, but the geographical entity of Clementi is generally regarded as the area dominated by HDB flats around Commonwealth Avenue West and the Clementi MRT station. Besides Clementi Road, the two other arterial roads that serve the new town are the Ayer Rajah Expressway and the West Coast Highway.

The primary residential district in Clementi is Clementi New Town and forms a large bulk of its residents and identity. The area also consists of many landed properties, especially in the West of the area.

The boundaries of Clementi New Town are Sunset Way Estate to the North, Clementi Road to the East, West Coast Highway to the South, and Clementi Avenue 6 to the West.

Neighbourhoods
There are 4 constituencies in the town, and 7 neighbourhoods (N1 to N7) within the Clementi vicinity. Most of the neighbourhoods are centralised or aligned along their respective neighbourhood centres, where most of the commercial activities are conducted, other than Clementi Town Centre.

Politics
Clementi was last an independent political constituency in the 1984 general election. Clementi now comes under the West Coast GRC (West Coast ward), Jurong GRC (Clementi ward) and Holland-Bukit Timah GRC (Ulu Pandan & Bukit Timah wards).

West Coast GRC is led by Minister for Transport, S Iswaran, and Minister for National Development, Desmond Lee.The constituency first faced a challenge from the Workers' Party in the 1997 general election. Since then, the constituency has received walkovers in both the 2001 and 2006 general elections.

In the 2011 general election, the PAP slate for five-member West Coast GRC, comprising Lim Hng Kiang, S. Iswaran, Arthur Fong, Lawrence Wong Shyun Tsai and Foo Mee Har, faced a contest against the Reform Party led by Kenneth Jeyaretnam.

Clementi was drawn into Jurong GRC after the electoral boundaries changed as a result of the 2015 general elections. The PAP-Jurong GRC team won 79.28% of the votes in that election. Dr Tan Wu Meng currently represents the Clementi division after winning a seat in the 2015 General Elections.

Currently, West Coast Town Council office is still being occupied in this very location at the Clementi Mall, but it is now meant for residents in Dover, Pandan Gardens, Teban Gardens and West Coast.

Amenities
The Commonwealth Cinema on the south side of Clementi MRT station was demolished in 2008 and rebuilt into a 4-storey shopping mall, previously named 'CityVibe', but has since been renamed to 'Grantal Mall'. The former Eng Wah's Empress Entertainment Centre Cineplex has also been rebuilt and reopened as '321 Clementi' in March 2015.

Further from the town centre, a shopping complex, West Coast Plaza, serves the upmarket residents of the condominiums and HDB flats along West Coast Road.

The Singapore Police 'D' Divisional Headquarters is located at Clementi Avenue 5, while the Clementi Neighbourhood Police Post is situated at Clementi Avenue 3. Clementi Fire Station is located off Commonwealth Avenue West.

In April 2005, the HDB announced plans to build a new mixed-use development at Clementi Town Centre, on the existing bus interchange site. The new development complex was to house a 5-storey retail podium with two basements, two 40-storey residential blocks (Clementi Towers), the West Coast Town Council (Clementi Office), a public library and an air-conditioned bus interchange. On 21 May 2011, The Clementi Mall – the retail shopping mall part of the mixed-use development, officially opened. The mall is linked directly to Clementi MRT station on the third level, and the air-conditioned Clementi Bus Interchange at the first level has direct access to the mall. It is the first development in Singapore to integrate public housing, public transport and commercial facilities built together within a single complex. On 15 May 2012, the mixed development won the prestigious international FIABCI Prix d'Excellence award, scoring the Runner-up award under the Master Plan Category.

Clementi United Temple, Singapore Buddhist Youth Mission, Ang Chee Sia Ong Temple and Tentera Di-Raja Mosque are some places of worship located in Clementi.

Dover Forest, located just across the Ulu Pandan Rd nearby condominiums such as Pine Tree Hill and Pine Grove is a half-century old secondary regrowth forest embedded in the urban matrix of Ulu Pandan, Singapore. Bounded by three roads and a concrete canal, its 33 hectares consist of western and eastern halves separated by a mowed grass lawn. Dover Forest is home to globally and locally endangered species such as the straw-headed bulbul, changeable hawk-eagle, oriental pied hornbill, Pila scutata, Ficus virens, and many more.

Recreation
Clementi has a swimming complex and a sports hall for badminton or table tennis located near the MRT station. The Clementi Stadium, with a capacity of 4,000, is located near West Coast Road and can be seen from the Ayer Rajah Expressway. West Coast Park and Clementi Woods Park are situated further away from the central area but are still accessible by bus.

The former West Coast Recreation Centre, which was located next to the Clementi Stadium, ceased operations in December 2019, and was demolished in 2020. During its time, it was home to iconic attractions such as the West Coast Billiard Saloon (relocated to WestWay), Aloha Cybercafe (permanently ceased operations), West Bowl, and Jack's Place (relocated to 321 Clementi).

Education

Clementi is serviced by several educational facilities, some of which have a long history. Primary schools in the area include Clementi Primary School, Nan Hua Primary School, Pei Tong Primary School and Qifa Primary School. Secondary schools include Clementi Town Secondary School, Nan Hua High School, New Town Secondary School, Tanglin Secondary School and Kent Ridge Secondary School. The NUS High School of Mathematics and Science, an independent school specialising in Mathematics and Science, is located at Clementi Avenue 1. The School of Science and Technology, Singapore, which specialises in Science, Technology and Applied Learning, is located at the junction of Clementi Road and Commonwealth Avenue West near Dover MRT station and Clementi MRT station as well.

Tertiary educational institutions bordering or situated along Clementi Road include Ngee Ann Polytechnic, SIM Headquarters, Singapore University of Social Sciences and the National University of Singapore (NUS). There is a direct bus service from the Clementi bus interchange that loops around the NUS campus. Singapore Polytechnic is located along Commonwealth Avenue West next to Dover MRT Station.

The Japanese School, Singapore or Singapore Nihonjin gakkō operates one of its two primary schools at Clementi Road, directly opposite NUS. A private Japanese Kindergarten is just next to the Japanese Secondary School. Waseda Shibuya Senior High School Singapore campus is also located at West Coast Road.

Transportation
Clementi New Town is served by Clementi MRT station (EW23) on the East West MRT line and bus services to Clementi Bus Interchange and different parts of the town.

The Clementi Bus Interchange is used mainly by SBS Transit and Tower Transit. Clementi Bus Interchange had moved temporarily on 29 October 2006. before the air-conditioned bus interchange opened on 26 November 2011.

Further reading
Victor R Savage, Brenda S A Yeoh (2003), Toponymics – A Study of Singapore Street Names, Eastern Universities Press,

References

External links

Places in Singapore
West Region, Singapore
Clementi
New towns started in the 1970s